Digital recorder may refer to:
Data logger
Digital camcorder
Digital video recorder (DVR) or personal video recorder (PVR)
Dictation machine

See also
Digital recording